In fluid dynamics, stagnation point flow represents the flow of a fluid in the immediate neighborhood of a stagnation point (or a stagnation line) with which the stagnation point (or the line) is identified for a potential flow or inviscid flow. The flow specifically considers a class of stagnation points known as saddle points where the incoming streamlines gets deflected and directed outwards in a different direction; the streamline deflections are guided by separatrices. The flow in the neighborhood of the stagnation point or line can generally be described using potential flow theory, although viscous effects cannot be neglected if the stagnation point lies on a solid surface.

Stagnation point flow without solid surfaces
When two streams either of two-dimensional or axisymmetric nature impinge on each other orthogonally, a stagnation plane is created, where the incoming streams are diverted tangentially outwards; thus on the stagnation plane, the velocity component normal to that plane is zero, whereas the tangential component is non-zero. In the neighborhood of the stagnation point, a local description for the velocity field can be described.

General three-dimensional velocity field
The stagnation point flow corresponds to a linear dependence on the coordinates, that can be described in the Cartesian coordinates  with velocity components  as follows

where  are constants referred as the strain rates; these constants are not completely arbitrary since the continuity equation requires , that is to say, only two of the three constants are independent. We shall assume  so that flow is towards the stagnation point in the  direction and away from the stagnation point in the  direction. Without loss of generality, one can assume that . The flow field can be categorized into different types based on a single parameter

Planar stagnation-point flow
The two-dimensional stagnation-point flow belongs to the case . The flow field is described as follows

where we let . This flow field is investigated as early as 1934 by G. I. Taylor. In the laboratory, this flow field is created using a four-mill apparatus, although these flow fields are ubiquitous in turbulent flows.

Axisymmetric stagnation-point flow
The flow field can be simply described in cylindrical coordinate system  with velocity components  as follows

where we let .

Radial stagnation flows
In radial stagnation flows, instead of a stagnation point, we have a stagnation circle and the stagnation plane is replaced by a stagnation cylinder. The radial stagnation flow is described using the cylindrical coordinate system  with velocity components  as follows

where  is the location of the stagnation cylinder.

Hiemenz flowBatchelor, George Keith. An introduction to fluid dynamics. Cambridge University Press, 2000. 

A familiar example where Hiemenz flow is applicable is the forward stagnation line that occurs in the flow over a circular cylinder.

According to potential flow theory, the fluid motion described in terms of the stream function  and the velocity components  are given by

The velocity component  is non-zero on the solid surface indicating that the above velocity field do not satisfy no-slip boundary condition on the wall. To find the velocity components that satisfy the no-slip boundary condition, one assumes the following form 

The existence of constant value for the viscous effects thickness is due to the competing balance between the fluid convection that is directed towards the solid surface and viscous diffusion that is directed away from the surface. Thus the vorticity produced at the solid surface is able to diffuse only to distances of order ; analogous situations that resembles this behavior occurs in asymptotic suction profile and von Kármán swirling flow. The velocity components, pressure and Navier–Stokes equations then become

The problem formulated here is a special case of Falkner-Skan boundary layer. The solution can be obtained from numerical integrations and is shown in the figure. The asymptotic behaviors for large  are

where  is the displacement thickness.

Stagnation point flow with a translating wall 
This problem describes the flow in the neighbourhood of the forward stagnation line occurring in a flow over a rotating cylinder. The required stream function is

where the function  satisfies 

The solution to the above equation is given by

Oblique stagnation point flow 
If the incoming stream is perpendicular to the stagnation line, but approaches obliquely, the outer flow is not potential, but has a constant vorticity .  The appropriate stream function for oblique stagnation point flow is given by 

Viscous effects due to the presence of a solid wall was studied by Stuart (1959), Tamada (1979) and Dorrepaal (1986). In their approach, the streamfunction takes the form

where the function  

.

Homann flow 

The solution for axisymmetric stagnation point flow in the presence of a solid wall was first obtained by Homann (1936). A typical example of this flow is the forward stagnation point appearing in a flow past a sphere. Paul A. Libby (1974)(1976) extended Homann's work by allowing the solid wall to translate along its own plane with a constant speed and allowing constant suction or injection at the solid surface.  

The solution for this problem is obtained in the cylindrical coorindate system  by introducing

The problem is axisymmetric only when . The pressure is given by

The Navier–Stokes equations then reduce to

along with boundary conditions,

When , the classical Homann problem is recovered.

Plane counterflows
Jets emerging from a slot-jets creates stagnation point in between according to potential theory. The flow near the stagnation point can by studied using self-similar solution. This setup is widely used in combustion experiments. The initial study of impinging stagnation flows are due to C.Y. Wang. 
Let two fluids with constant properties denoted with suffix  flowing from opposite direction impinge, and assume the two fluids are immiscible and the interface (located at ) is planar. The velocity is given by

where  are strain rates of the fluids. At the interface, velocities, tangential stress and pressure must be continuous.
Introducing the self-similar transformation,

 
results equations,

The no-penetration condition at the interface and free stream condition far away from the stagnation plane become

But the equations require two more boundary conditions. At , the tangential velocities , the tangential stress  and the pressure  are continuous. Therefore,

where  (from outer inviscid problem) is used. Both  are not known apriori, but derived from matching conditions. The third equation is determine variation of outer pressure  due to the effect of viscosity. So there are only two parameters, which governs the flow, which are

then the boundary conditions become

.

References 

Fluid mechanics
Fluid dynamics